Robert C. Seacord (born June 5, 1963) is an American computer security specialist and writer.  He is the author of books on computer security, legacy system modernization, and component-based software engineering.

Education 
Seacord earned a Bachelor's degree in computer science from Rensselaer Polytechnic Institute in December 1983. He has also completed graduate-level courses at Carnegie-Mellon University in software design, creation and maintenance; user interfaces; software project management; formal methods; human factors; operating systems; and entrepreneurship.

Career 
Seacord began programming professionally for IBM in 1984, working in processor development, then communications and operating system software, and software engineering. He led the Secure Coding Initiative in the CERT Division of Carnegie Mellon University's Software Engineering Institute (SEI) in Pittsburgh, Pennsylvania until 1991, working on the User Interface Project. He also has worked at the X Consortium in Cambridge, Massachusetts, where he developed and maintained code for the Common Desktop Environment and the X Window System. He returned to SEI in 1996, working on component-based software engineering and joined CERT in 2003. He left CERT and the SEI and joined NCC Group in 2015, as a Technical Director. 

Seacord was an adjunct professor in the Carnegie Mellon School of Computer Science and in the Information Networking Institute. He was also a part-time faculty member at the University of Pittsburgh.

Seacord is on the Advisory Board for the Linux Foundation and a technical expert for the ISO/IEC JTC1/SC22/WG14 international standardization working group for the C programming language. He co-wrote the 2016 Facebook osquery audit.

In February 2022 Seacord joined Woven Planet Holdings, where he is Standardization Lead, working with Toyota and its suppliers on quality software development.

Selected publications

Books 
 
 Seacord, Robert. The CERT® C Coding Standard, Second Edition: 98 Rules for Developing Safe, Reliable, and Secure Systems (2nd Edition), Addison-Wesley Professional, 2014. .
 Lon, Fred; Mohindra, Dhruv; Seacord, Robert; Sutherland, Dean F.; and Svoboda, David. Java Coding Guidelines: 75 Recommendations for Reliable and Secure Programs, Addison-Wesley, 2014. .
 Seacord, Robert. Secure Coding in C and C++, Second Edition, Addison Wesley, 2013. 
Seacord, Robert; Long, Fred; Mohindra, Dhruv; Sutherland, Dean; Svoboda, David. The CERT® Oracle® Secure Coding Standard for Java, Addison Wesley, 2011. 
 Seacord, Robert. The CERT® C Secure Coding Standard, Addison Wesley, 2008. 
 Seacord, Robert; Plakosh, Daniel; Lewis, Grace. Modernizing Legacy Systems: Software Technologies, Engineering Processes, and Business Practices, Addison Wesley, 2003. 
 Seacord, Robert, Wallnau, Kurt;  Hissam, Scott. Building Systems from Commercial Components, Addison Wesley, 2001.

Videos 

 Professional C Programming LiveLessons, (Video Training) Part I: Writing Robust, Secure, Reliable Code 
 Secure Coding Rules for Java LiveLessons, Part I 
 Secure Coding Rules for Java: Serialization LiveLessons (Video Training)

Selected articles

References

External links 
 Secure Coding and Integers (audio, 45:46)
  (video, 1:12:24)
  (video,  47:10)
 Robert Seacord on the intersection of DevOps and security (audio, 14:39)
 Dangerous Optimizations And The Loss Of Causality (video, 45:05)
  (video, 4:30)
 osquery Application Security Assessment Public Report (public report commissioned by Facebook, March 2016)

People from New York (state)
1963 births
Living people
American technology writers
People associated with computer security
Rensselaer Polytechnic Institute alumni